The Public Investment Corporation (PIC) is a South African state-owned entity (SOC) with R2.548 trillion (USD 148 Billion) of assets under management as of 31 March 2022. It is Africa's largest asset manager. Established in 1911, it holds large stakes in several South African companies, and is one of the entities through which the government implements its policy of Broad-Based Black Economic Empowerment.  The PIC is also responsible for investing the South African Government Employees Pension Fund (GEPF).

History
The organisation has its origin in 1911 with passing of the Public Debt Commissioners Act of 1911, a year after the formation of the Union of South Africa. Known then as the Public Debt Commissioners, it would manage the government's debt, investing the government and South African Railways and Harbours trust funds and by 1924 had taken on the provincial administrators funds as well. By the mid-1920s it would manage the granting of loans to local governments in the country. The Pension funds managed would allow the government to borrow against those funds. In 1984, a new act, the Public Investment Commissioners Act No.45 of 1984, which moved its focus from debt to investment management, investing funds on behalf of government organisations, the appointment of commissioners and with the finance minister as its chairman.

With the first free election in South Africa in 1994, the Public Investment Commissioners announced the formation of the Isibaya Fund in 1995. This saw a portion of the money managed diverted to the new fund to invest in Socially Responsible Investments to target economic growth transformations in population groups disadvantaged during apartheid. The next change came in 2004 with a new act passed called the Public Investment Corporation Act of 2004, where the Public Investment Commission became legalised corporate asset managers. Now a client's specific investment objectives would be expresses in a detailed client investment mandate which are individually negotiated with a client concerned and approved by the Financial Services Board.

Governance
The current chairman is also the South African Deputy Minister of Finance and was appointed by the Minister of Finance. The chairman is a government member mainly due to the high percentage of government pension funds under management by the Public Investment Corporation. All other directors are also appointed by Minister of Finance.

Dr Reuel Khoza (chairperson) (non-executive director)
Ms Futhi Mtoba (deputy chairperson) (non-executive director)
Ms Irene Charnley (non-executive director)
Dr Angelo David Sabelo de Bruyn (non-executive director)
Prof Bonke Dumisa (non-executive director)
Mr Bhekithemba Gamedze (non-executive director)
Mr Mugwena Maluleke (non-executive director)
Ms Tshepiso Moahloli (non-executive director)
Mr Pitsi Moloto (non-executive director)
Ms Karabo Morule (non-executive director)
Adv Makhubalo Ndaba (non-executive director)
Ms Maria Ramos (non-executive director)
Ms Barbara Watson (non-executive director)
Mr Abel Sithole (chief executive officer) (executive director)
Mr Brian Mavuka (acting chief financial officer) (executive director)

PIC clients and share of total assets under management
The following figures shows the share of the total assets under management by PIC from each public institution in South Africa as of 31 March 2020:
 Government Employees Pension Fund (GEPF) – 85.92%
 Unemployment Insurance Fund (UIF) – 7.97%
 Compensation Commissioner Fund (CC) – 2.07%
 Compensation Commissioner Pension Fund (CP) – 1.43%
 Associated Institutions Pension Fund (AIPF) – 0.81%
 Constitutes various clients with smaller portfolios – 1.80%

Funds held under management
The total assets held under management by the Public Investment Corporation as at 31 March each year are:
{| class="wikitable"
|-
! Date(31 Mar) !! Total funds(trillions) 
! % Change!! Notes
|-
| 2003 || R0.309 
| N/A||
|-
| 2004 || R0.377 
| 22,01%||
|-
| 2005 || R0.461 
| 22,28%||
|-
| 2006 || R0.599 
| 29,93%||
|-
| 2007 || R0.720 
| 20,20%||
|-
| 2008 || R0.787 
| 9,31%||
|-
| 2009 || R0.740 
| -5,97%||
|-
| 2010 || R0.911 
| 23,11%||
|-
| 2011 || R1.032 
| 13,28%||
|-
| 2012 || R1.170 
| 13,37%||
|-
| 2013 || R1.400 
| 19,66%||
|-
| 2014 || R1.600 
| 14,29%||
|-
|2015 || R1.810 
| 13,13%||
|-
| 2016 || R1.857 
| 2,60%||
|-
| 2017 || R1.928 
| 3,82%||
|-
| 2018 || R2.083 
| 8,04%||
|-
|2019
|| R2.164
|3,89%
|
|-
|2020
|| R1.907
| -11,88%
|
|-
|2021
| R2.339||22,65%
|
|-
|2022
| 2.548
|
|
|}

Investments
As a long-term investor, the Public Investment Corporation sets its objective as one to achieve returns higher than the clients have benchmarked and is spread amongst four investments areas:

 Fixed income and dealing – Manages all fixed bonds in which the Public Investment Corporation has invested. A government corporation or parastatal would approach the Public Investment Corporation to borrow funds and in exchange a fixed interest bearing bond would be issued and managed on behalf of the former organisations. They are a member of the Bond Exchange of South Africa (BESA).
 Listed equities – Their largest client is the Government Employees Pension Fund (GEPF) with approximately 80% of the stocks managed internally and external managers managing the remaining 20% of the fund with the ability to invest up to 10% of the funds outside of South Africa. Its investment on the Johannesburg Stock Exchange is worth approximately 12.5% of the exchanges capitalisation.
 Properties – Manages high-quality retail, offices and industrial properties including property asset management, property development and new property acquisitions. The clients of the property fund are the Government Employees Pension Fund (GEPF), the Unemployment Insurance Fund (UIF) and the Compensation Commissioner Fund (CC). Some of the properties managed or part managed are the Menlyn Shopping Centre, Cresta Shopping Centre, The Pavilion, Tyger Valley Centre, Westgate and Southgate shopping centres as well as the Minosa and Victoria & Alfred Waterfront and the Airports Company South Africa, owner of national and international airports.
 Isibaya – making use of a portion of clients funds, it provides financing for projects that contribute to long-term economic, social, and environmental outcomes in South Africa but provide a financial returns for the client.

See also
 Sovereign wealth fund
 List of countries by sovereign wealth funds

References

External links
 Official Website

Financial services companies established in 1911
Investment in South Africa
Public pension funds
Sovereign wealth funds
1911 establishments in South Africa